Eduard Birkenberg (2 February 1872 Saku Parish, Harrien County – 20 November 1943 Tallinn) was an Estonian politician. He was a member of Estonian Constituent Assembly, representing the Estonian People's Party and of the I and II Riigikogu, representing the Farmers' Assemblies. He was a member of the Constituent Assembly since 12 December 1919. He replaced Peeter Põld. Birkenberg himself resigned on 21 October 1920 and he was replaced by Gustav Seen.

References

1872 births
1943 deaths
People from Saku Parish
People from Kreis Harrien
Estonian People's Party politicians
Farmers' Assemblies politicians
Members of the Estonian Constituent Assembly
Members of the Riigikogu, 1920–1923
Members of the Riigikogu, 1923–1926